Francis Owington "Rogers (October 21, 1876 – November 8, 1939) was an American college football player and physician.

Early years
Rogers was born on October 21, 1876, in Salisbury, North Carolina, to B. F. Rogers and Mattie Harkey.

University of North Carolina
Rogers was a prominent quarterback for the North Carolina Tar Heels football team of the University of North Carolina. In his freshman  year he was captain of the team.

1898
Rogers was captain of the undefeated, Southern champion 1898 team. It is the only undefeated team in the history of UNC football. He was selected All-Southern, "and exhibited generalship of a high order."

Physician
Rogers was then educated in medicine at the University of Maryland School of Medicine, receiving his M. D. in 1901. He was once a resident physician at St. Joseph's Hospital in Baltimore and then a practicing physician in Concord, North Carolina. Much later he practiced in Little Rock, Arkansas.

Marriage
He married Emma Antoinette Tillar in Galveston, Texas on October 26, 1909.

Death
He died in a Memphis hospital after suffering a heart attack.

References

External links
 

1876 births
1939 deaths
19th-century players of American football
20th-century American physicians
American football quarterbacks
North Carolina Tar Heels football players
All-Southern college football players
University of Maryland School of Medicine alumni
Sportspeople from Little Rock, Arkansas
People from Salisbury, North Carolina
Players of American football from North Carolina